Óscar Esplá y Triay (5 August 1886 – 6 January 1976) was a Spanish composer. The Conservatorio Superior de Música (conservatory) of the city of Alicante is dedicated to him. The Premio internacional de composición Óscar Esplá (Óscar Esplá international prize for composition) was created in 1955 and is awarded by the city of Alicante.

Life

Óscar Esplá was born on 5 August 1886 in Alicante, in the Kingdom of Spain. In 1903 he went to Barcelona to study industrial engineering, but later changed to study philosophy. He studied composition with Francisco Sánchez Gavagnac. In 1911, after winning an international prize, he went to Austria and Germany; he met Ferdinand Löwe in Vienna, and Max Reger in Meiningen. In 1912–13 he was in Paris; he met Saint-Saëns, but there is no evidence that he studied with him.

In 1936 Esplá was appointed director of the Conservatorio Nacional de Música y Declamación in Madrid, but did not take up the position. Instead, because of the Spanish Civil War, he left Spain and went with his family to Belgium, where he worked for Le Soir, which at that time was under Nazi control. He was not permitted to return to Spain until 1950. With Roberto Gerhard, Frederic Mompou and Adolfo Salazar, he was a part of the Spanish Grupo de los cuatro.

Honours
Esplá was elected to the Académie des Beaux-Arts de Paris on 9 May 1956. In 1959 he received the Grand Cross of the Orden de Alfonso X el Sabio. He was elected an honorary member of the International Society for Contemporary Music in 1965.

Works 
El sueño de Eros (1910), symphonic poem
Suite levantina (1911)
La nochebuena del diablo (1923), cantata
Don Quijote velando las armas (1924), symphonic poem
Himno republicano (1931), which contributed to the official version of the Himno de Riego under the Second Spanish Republic (1931–1939)
Tres Canciones (1952)
Sinfonía Aitana (1964)

Notes

References

Further reading 
Luis Español Bouché (2005) "Oscar Esplá: la música en el exilio", Ateneístas Ilustres, Madrid: Ateneo de Madrid, pp. 261–270
Jan de Kloe (2001) Oscar Esplá in Belgium (1936–1949), Columbus: Editions Orphée
Jeannine Bouché (1998) Cancionero de Joaquín Turina y Óscar Esplá, Madrid: J. Bouché
[various] (1996) Sociedad Arte y Cultura en la obra de Óscar Esplá, Madrid: Instituto Nacional de Arts Escénicas y de la Música
Emiliano García Alcázar (1993) Óscar Esplá y Triay: (Alicante, 5-8-1886, Madrid, 6-1-1976): estudio monográfico y documental, Alicante: Instituto de Cultura Juan Gil-Albert; CAM, Fundación Cultural
Antonio Iglesias (1973) Óscar Esplá, Madrid: Servicio de Publicaciones de Educación y Ciencia

External links 

Conservatorio Superior de Música Óscar Esplá de Alicante

1886 births
1976 deaths
Spanish classical composers
Spanish male classical composers
People from Alicante
20th-century classical composers
20th-century Spanish musicians
20th-century Spanish male musicians